Masratu is a census town in the Katkamdag CD block in the Hazaribagh Sadar subdivision of  the Hazaribagh district in the Indian state of Jharkhand.

Geography

Location                          

Demographics
According to the 2011 Census of India, Masratu (location code 368709) had a total population of 5,996, of which 3,161 (53%) were males and 2,835 (47%) were females. Population in the age range 0–6 years was 904. The total number of literate persons in Masratu was 3,806 (74.74% of the population over 6 years).

Infrastructure
According to the District Census Handbook 2011, Hazaribagh, Masratu covered an area of 3.75 km2. Among the civic amenities, it had 7 km roads with open drains, the protected water supply involved uncovered well, hand pump. It had 685 domestic electric connections. Among the educational facilities it had 6 primary schools, 3 middle schools, other educational facilities at Hazaribagh 6 km away. Among the social, recreational and cultural facilities, it had 3 stadiums, 1 public library, reading room. An important commodity it manufactured was chhana. It had office of 1 cooperative bank.

Transport
Hazaribagh Town railway station on the Koderma–Hazaribagh–Barkakana–Ranchi line is located nearby.

References

Cities and towns in Hazaribagh district